"Flashed Junk Mind" is a song performed by German duo Milky Chance. It was released as a digital download on 29 August 2014 through Lichtdicht as the third and final single from their debut studio album Sadnecessary (2013). The song was written and produced by Milky Chance.

Music video
A music video to accompany the release of "Flashed Junk Mind" was first released onto YouTube on 19 September 2014 at a total length of three minutes and fifty-eight seconds.

Track listing

Charts

Weekly charts

Year-end charts

Certifications

Release history

References

2014 singles
2014 songs